This is a list of notable Ethiopians, sorted by the fields for which they are best known. The list includes people born in and residing in Ethiopia, as well as people strongly associated with Ethiopia, and people of significant Ethiopian ancestry.

Academics and philosophers

 Alemayehu Fentaw Weldemariam 
 Mohamed Hikam Sheikh Abdirahman, Islamic scholar
 Dereje Agonafer, Professor of Mechanical Engineering at University of Texas at Arlington
 Amsalu Aklilu, lexicographer of Amharic
 Hizkias Assefa, professor of conflict studies and consulting mediator
 Bahrey, 16th-century monk historian
 Gäbre-Heywät Baykädañ (1886-1919), intellectual and reformer who served as treasurer for Emperor Menelik II
 Yosef Ben-Jochannan, writer and historian
 Eleni Gebre-Medhin, economist
 Gebisa Ejeta, 2009 World Food Prize laureate and Distinguished Professor at Purdue University
 Getatchew Haile, scholar of the Ge'ez language
 Walda Heywat, philosopher
 Ephraim Isaac, scholar of ancient languages
 Taddesse Tamrat, Ethiopian historian
 Shekh Muhammad Tānī, Islamic scholar
 Merid Wolde Aregay, Ethiopian historian
 Mesfin Woldemariam, academician
 Zewde Gebre-Sellassie

Artists

 Mickaël Bethe-Selassié, papier mâché sculptor
 Alexander Boghossian
 Gebre Kristos Desta
 Wosene Worke Kosrof
 Tadesse Mamechae, sculptor
 Julie Mehretu
Aida Muluneh, photographer
 Afewerk Tekle
 Abel Tilahun, visual artist
 Elizabeth Habte Wold, mixed-media artist
 Zerihun Yetmgeta
 Ale Felege Selam

Athletes

 Gezahegne Abera 
 Haimro Alame (born 1990), Ethiopian-born Israeli runner
 Bezunesh Bekele
 Kenenisa Bekele (born 1982), long-distance runner
 Almensh Belete (born 1989, Addis Ababa), female long-distance runner
 Abebe Bikila (1932-1973), long-distance runner
 Worku Bikila (born 1968), long-distance runner
 Meseret Defar 
 Baruch Dego 
 Ejegayehu Dibaba
 Genzebe Dibaba
 Tirunesh Dibaba
 Ageze Guadie (born 1989), Ethiopian-born Israeli Olympic marathon runner
 Haile Gebrselassie
 Letesenbet Gidey, 5000 meters world record holder
 Sifan Hassan, Ethiopian-born Dutch middle- and long-distance runner
 Youssouf Hersi
 Benjamin Kibebe 
 Werknesh Kidane 
 Tesama Moogas, Ethiopian-born Israeli Olympic marathon runner
 Jamal Sadat, footballer
 Theodor Gebre Selassie
 Lencho Skibba
 Ydnekatchew Tessema
 Derartu Tulu 
 Italo Vassalo 
 Luciano Vassalo
 Asi Vassihon (born 1982), Ethiopian-Israeli footballer
 Mamo Wolde (1932-2002), long-distance runner
 Million Wolde 
 Mengistu Worku 
 Andargachew Yelak, footballer
 Miruts Yifter
 Zohar Zemiro (born 1977), Israeli marathon runner

Businesspeople

 Mahlet Afework, fashion designer and entrepreneur
 Tewodros Ashenafi, CEO of SouthWest Energy
 Sophia Bekele, corporate executive and entrepreneur
 Betelhem Dessie (born 1999), tech entrepreneur 
 Mohammed Hussein Al Amoudi (born 1946), Ethiopian-Saudi billionaire 
 Juneidi Basha, business executive
 Melesse Temesgen (born 1964), businessman and researcher
 Mazengia Demma, businessman and investor
 Eleni Gebre-Medhin, entrepreneur and business woman
 Tewolde Gebremariam, business executive, former Chief Executive Officer of Ethiopian Airlines
 Girma Wake, business executive and Chairman of Ethiopian Airlines

Diplomats and ambassadors
 Aida Girma-Melaku UNICEF Representative in Pakistan 
 Tekeda Alemu (born 1951), representative to the United Nations
 Teketel Forsido, ambassador and former Minister of Agriculture
 Abdul Majid Hussein (1944-2004), representative to the United Nations
 Makonnen Kebret, diplomat and agricultural education specialist
 Atsede Kidanu, career diplomat
 Mateus, 16th-century ambassador to Portugal and Rome
 Andargachew Messai (1902-1981), diplomat and husband of Princess Tenagnework Haile Selassie
 Saga za Ab, 16th-century ambassador to Europe
 Lorenzo Taezaz, (1900-1947), diplomat and later Minister of Foreign Affairs
 Tayé-Brook Zerihoun (born 1942), Assistant Secretary-General for Political Affairs in the United Nations Department of Political Affairs

Entertainers

 Senait Ashenafi, actor
 Mahder Assefa, actress
 Dege Feder, dancer
 Tesfaye Sahlu (1920-2017), comedian and children's television host
 Alebachew Teka, actor and comedian

Fashion models

 Gelila Bekele
 Liya Kebede
 Sara Nuru
 Berta Vázquez

Filmmakers

 Adanech Admassu
 Haile Gerima
 Nnegest Likke
 Theodros Teshome

Humanitarians

 Yohannes Gebregeorgis
Abebech Gobena
 Lale Labuko
 Yetnebersh Nigussie
 Alemayehu Fentaw Weldemariam
 Mesfin Woldemariam

Military personnel
 Haile Tilahun Gebremariam, former Ethiopian National Defense Force (ENDF) general, present Head of Mission of the United Nations Interim Security Force for Abyei (UNISFA)
 Lieutenant General Birhanu Jula Gelalcha, Force Commander of UNISFA from 2014 to 2016
 Major General Tesfay Gidey Hailemichael, Force Commander of UNISFA from 2017 to 2018
 Major General Halefom Ejigu Moges, acting Head of Mission of UNISFA from 2014 to 2015
 Major General Hassen Ebrahim Mussa, Force Commander of UNISFA from 2016 to 2017
 Lieutenant General Tadesse Werede Tesfay, commander of UNISFA from 2011 to 2013
 Major General Yohannes Gebremeskel Tesfamariam, commander of UNISFA from 2013 to 2014
 Major General Gebre Adhana Woldezgu, Force Commander of UNISFA since 2018

Musicians

 Aminé, American rapper of Ethiopian descent 
 Mulugeta Abate, songwriter and composer
 Teddy Afro, singer
 Alemu Aga
 Mahmoud Ahmed, singer
 Tadesse Alemu
 Mulatu Astatke, musician and father of "ethio-jazz"
 Aster Aweke, singer
 Abatte Barihun, jazz saxophonist and composer
 Aragaw Bedaso, traditional singer
 Eyasu Berhe, singer
 Girma Bèyènè
 Ali Birra, singer and composer
 Tamrat Desta, singer-songwriter 
 Alemayehu Eshete, Ethio-jazz singer
 Rophnan, electronic musician and songwriter
 Tilahun Gessesse, singer
 Gigi, singer
 Thomas Gobena, bassist of the Gypsy punk band Gogol Bordello
 Hachalu Hundessa, Oromo singer-songwriter 
 Kenna
 Getatchew Mekurya, jazz, saxophonist
 Munit Mesfin, singer-songwriter
 LoLa Monroe, rapper, model, actress
 Emilia Rydberg, partial Ethiopian descent, performs in English and Swedish
 Kuku Sebsebe
 Kiros Alemayehu, Tigrayan singer
 Tigist Shibabaw, singer, sister of Gigi
 Shantam Shubissa, composer, singer, and poet
 Walias Band
 Wayna
 The Weeknd, Canadian performer of Ethiopian ancestry
 Asnaketch Worku, singer and krar player
 Dawit Yifru, keyboardist and music arranger
 Gildo Kassa, music composer and singer

Nobility 

 Faisal bin Turki, Sultan of Muscat and Oman
 Menen Asfaw
 Taytu Betul
 Abram Petrovich Gannibal
 Girma Yohannis Iyasu
 Iyasu II
 Iyasu V
 Prince Makonnen
 Menelik II
 Amha Selassie
 Haile Selassie I
 Zera Yacob Amha Selassie
 Princess Tenagnework
 Tewodros II
 Yohannes IV of Ethiopia
 Zewditu I
 Imru Haile Selassie
 Seifu Mikael
 Kassa Hailu

Physicians

 Gebrehiwot Baykedagn
 Workneh Eshete (1864-1952), first Ethiopian to be educated as a medical doctor

Political figures

 Fisseha Adugna
 Abiy Ahmed
 Aman Mikael Andom 
 Andualem Aragie (born 1972), Vice President and Press Secretary for the Unity for Democracy and Justice (UDJP) party
 Fitsum Assefa
 Lidetu Ayalew
 Tafari Benti
 Hailemariam Desalegn
 Tsehafi Taezaz Aklilu Habte-Wold
 Tesfaye Gebre Kidan
 Bulcha Demeksa
 Merera Gudina
 Harka Haroyu
 Adem Ibrahim, former Minister of Health
 Tamirat Layne
 Negeri Lencho, Minister of Communications
 Endelkachew Makonnen
 Mengistu Haile Mariam
 Seyoum Mesfin
 Birtukan Mideksa
 Beyene Petros
 Mazi Melesa Pilip, Ethiopian-born American politician
 Haile Fida
 Berhanu Nega
 Mulu Nega
 Arkebe Oqubay
 Haile Selassie
 Hailu Shawel
 Lia Tadesse
 Zinash Tayachew
 Tekle Hawariat Tekle Mariyam (1884-1977), contributing author to the 1931 Constitution of Ethiopia
 Roman Tesfaye
 Mulatu Teshome
 Samuel Urkato
 Fikre Selassie Wogderess
 Asrat Woldeyes
 Girma Wolde-Giorgis
 Hailu Yimenu
 Meles Zenawi

Religious people

 Abu Rumi, first to translate Bible into Amharic
 Aster Ganno, Oromo Bible translator, collector of folklore, and teacher
 Dawit Amanuel, Bible translator into Tigre 
 Jamāl al-Dīn b. Muḥammad al-Annī, Islamic scholar who introduced the Qādirī order to Ethiopia
 Onesimos Nesib, Oromo Bible translator
 Tekle Haymanot, saint of Ethiopian Orthodox Church
 Tewolde-Medhin Gebre-Medhin, Bible translator into Tigre and Tigrinya
 Yonatan Aklilu, founder of  the Addis Kidan Kahinat Church

Saints

 Abuna Aregawi
 Ewostatewos
 Tekle Haymanot
 Iyasus Mo'a
 Gabra Manfas Qeddus
 Kristos Samra
 Emperor Tewodros II, martyr
 Abuna Theophilos
 Samuel of Dabra Wagag
 Walatta Petros
 Yared
 Emperor Yohannes IV of Ethiopia, martyr

Scientists

Zeresenay Alemseged, anthropologist
Berhane Asfaw, anthropologist
Kitaw Ejigu
 Gebisa Ejeta
 Sossina M. Haile
 Tewolde Berhan Gebre Egziabher
 Aklilu Lemma
 Legesse Wolde-Yohannes
 Melaku Worede
 Yohannes Haile-Selassie
 Segenet Kelemu

Writers

 Haddis Alemayehu
 Bahrey
 Yemodish Bekele (born 1960), journalist and author
 Dhoodaan (1941-2013), Somali-Ethiopian poet
Tsegaye Gebre-Medhin
 Baalu Girma, author of Oromay
 Abe Gubegna
 Sebhat Guèbrè-Egziabhér
 Getatchew Haile
 Alaqa Gebre Hanna, master of qene poetry
 Afawarq Gabra Iyasus
 Moges Kebede
 Kebede Michael
 Maaza Mengiste
 Dinaw Mengestu
 Eskinder Nega
 Heruy Welde Sellase
 Abiye Teklemariam
 Alemayehu Fentaw Weldemariam
 Mammo Wudneh
 Bewketu Seyoum

Other notable people
Amsale Gualu, first female airline captain
Marcus Samuelsson, chef
Adeneko Svhat-Haimovitch, judge in Israel
Eyerusalem Jiregna, photographer and photojournalist

See also
Ethiopian historiography

References